Sunay is a Turkish name and may refer to:

Given name
 Sunay Akın (born 1962), Turkish poet

Surname
 Cevdet Sunay (1899–1982), Turkish army officer, political leader and the fifth President of Turkey,
Atıfet Sunay  (1903–2002), fifth First Lady of Turkey

Other uses
 Sunay, a Uyghur musical instrument, similar to the Iranian sorna, Turkish zurna, and Chinese suona.

Turkish masculine given names
Turkish-language surnames